Walter Louis Nixon Jr. (born December 16, 1928) is a former United States district judge of the United States District Court for the Southern District of Mississippi who in 1989 was impeached by the House of Representatives and removed from office by the Senate. Because Nixon's impeachment was for perjury, the case was cited as a precedent in the impeachment trial of President Bill Clinton.

Education and career

Born in 1928, in Biloxi, Mississippi, Nixon received a Juris Doctor in 1951 from Tulane University Law School. He entered private practice in Biloxi from 1952 to 1968, interrupted by service in the United States Air Force from 1953 to 1955.

Federal judicial service

Nixon was nominated by President Lyndon B. Johnson on May 29, 1968, to the United States District Court for the Southern District of Mississippi, to a new seat authorized by 80 Stat. 75. He was confirmed by the United States Senate on June 6, 1968, and received his commission on June 7, 1968. He served as Chief Judge from 1982 to 1989. His service terminated on November 3, 1989, due to his impeachment and conviction.

Impeachment
Nixon was convicted in 1986 on perjury charges and sentenced to 5 years in prison. The offense stemmed from his grand jury testimony and statements to federal officers concerning his intervention in the state drug prosecution of Drew Fairchild, the son of Wiley Fairchild, a business partner of Nixon. Although the case was assigned to a state court, Wiley Fairchild had asked Nixon to help out by speaking to the prosecutor. Nixon did so, and the prosecutor, a long-time friend, dropped the case. When Nixon was interviewed by the Federal Bureau of Investigation (FBI) and the United States Department of Justice, he denied any involvement whatsoever. Subsequently, a federal grand jury was empaneled and he again denied his involvement. He was convicted of making false statements to a grand jury.  In 1989, he was impeached by the United States House of Representatives and convicted by the Senate, for committing perjury before a grand jury. Upon his conviction by the Senate, he was removed from office.

Nixon appealed his impeachment and removal to the United States Supreme Court. In Nixon v. United States, handed down in 1993, the Court rejected his appeal as a nonjusticiable political question. He returned to private practice in Mississippi from 1993 to 1998. He has practiced law in Lake Charles, Louisiana since 1998.

See also

Federal impeachment in the United States
Alcee Hastings

References

Sources
Testimony of Charles J. Cooper before the House Judiciary Committee Subcommittee on the Constitution, November 9, 1998
Louisiana State Bar directory
Mississippi Bar directory

|-

1928 births
20th-century American judges
Disbarred American lawyers
Impeached United States federal judges removed from office
Judges convicted of crimes
Judges of the United States District Court for the Southern District of Mississippi
Living people
Louisiana lawyers
Military personnel from Mississippi
Mississippi lawyers
Mississippi politicians convicted of crimes
People convicted of making false statements
People from Biloxi, Mississippi
Tulane University Law School alumni
United States district court judges appointed by Lyndon B. Johnson